Hypatopa hulstella is a moth in the family Blastobasidae. It is found in the United States, including Maine.

References

Moths described in 1910
Hypatopa